Stanisław Eugeniusz Wróblewski (13 September 1959 – 3 June 2019) was a Polish wrestler who competed at the 1980 Summer Olympics.

Wróblewski died on 3 June 2019 at the age of 59.

References

1959 births
2019 deaths
Olympic wrestlers of Poland
Wrestlers at the 1980 Summer Olympics
Polish male sport wrestlers
People from Kutno
Sportspeople from Łódź Voivodeship